The Finn was a sailing event in the sailing program of the 1956 Summer Olympics, held on Port Phillip. Seven races were scheduled. 20 sailors, on 20 boats, from 20 nations competed.

Results 

DNF = Did Not Finish, DNS= Did Not Start, DSQ = Disqualified 
 = Male,  = Female

Daily standings

Conditions on Port Phillip 
Three race areas were needed during the Olympics on Port Phillip. Each of the classes used the same scoring system. The southern course was used for the Finn.

Notes

References 
 
 
 

Finn
Finn competitions